Paravoor Govindan Devarajan (1927–2006), popularly known as G. Devarajan or Devarajan master, was an Indian music composer and Carnatic singer. He is widely regarded as one of the greatest composers in the history of Indian film music. He scored music for more than three hundred Malayalam films, many dramas, and twenty Tamil and four Kannada movies. His collaborations with Vayalar Ramavarma produced the golden era of Malayalam film music and many of his compositions remain ever green classics in Malayalam. His music in the Tamil film Annai Velankanni has received many accolades. Devarajan received Kerala Government's Best Music Director award five times, among other honours. In 2005, he was honoured with the J. C. Daniel Award, Kerala government's highest honour for contributions to Malayalam cinema.

Early life
Born at Paravur, near Kollam in then Travancore to mridangist and classical singer Paravur Kochu Govindan Asan and Kochukunju as their eldest son. His grandfather, Narayanan Asan, was a Kathakali artist.

His dad, though he was a mridangam vidwan and a disciple of Dakshinamurthy Pillai, primarily taught vocal to his students, and thus Devarajan learned Carnatic vocal for around 12–13 years adeptly from his own father through that. He did his intermediate college at University College in Thiruvananthapuram from 1946 to 1948 and passed with First Class. He additionally graduated with BA in Economics from Mahatma Gandhi College, Thiruvanthapuram.

Devarajan, under the name of Paravur Devarajan or Paravur G. Devaraj, started his illustrious career in music as a classical singer and performed his first classical concert at the age of 17 and started to perform more concerts on AIR Tiruchi and Trivandrum. He performed a number of classical concerts from 1947 to 1967 with multiple accompanists, his usual ones being Chalakudy Narayanaswamy and Mavelikara Krishnankutty Nair. At the end of his classical concerts, he used to set tunes to the poems of Ulloor Parameswaran Iyer, Kumaranasan, Changampuzha, G. Kumarapilla, O. N. V. Kurup, P. Bhaskaran, amongst many others.

He was soon attracted to the Communist movement and decided to dedicate his creative energy to popular music.  He joined the once-famous drama troupe of Kerala, the Kerala People's Arts Club (KPAC). The work that brought him to the limelight was the drama song titled "Ponnarivaal ambiliyil kanneriyunnoole", written by his friend O. N. V. Kurup and composed and sung by himself. KPAC and its members had a distinctive leaning towards the communist ideology, and their dramas played a role in spreading the ideology among the Keralite masses. Through his compositions, Devarajan would cast an indelible imprint in the Malayali theatre arena, especially after the famous KPAC drama Ningalenne Communistaakki, written by Thoppil Bhasi in 1952.

Film career
The first movie for which he composed music was Kaalam Maarunnu (1955). He teamed up with poet-lyricist Vayalar Ramavarma in Chathurangam in 1959. His third movie – and the second with Vayalar – Bharya (1962) became a huge hit and made them a popular combination. His collaborations with Vayalar produced the golden era of Malayalam film music. Devarajan is remembered by singers in Malayalam like K. J. Yesudas and Jayachandran as their Godfather. 

Devarajan was known for his use of numerous raagas in Malayalam film music, using more than 100s of them in his compositions. His music embraced different styles with the Carnatic and Hindustani melody lines meeting folk idioms and Western harmony. Despite being a strong atheist, he composed devotional songs like "Harivarasanam", "Guruvayoor Ambalanadayil", "Chethi Mandaram Thulasi", and "Nithyavishudhayam Kanyamariyame", which are considered classics in that genre. Also, he is particularly noted for his remarkable ability to blend the words of the lyrics with the mood of the situation in his film song compositions, exercising self-restraint while writing songs for the uninitiated audience without relinquishing the magic of his poetry. Most of his hit songs were written by Vayalar Ramavarma. The Vayalar-Devarajan combine proved the most successful team till the death of Vayalar in the mid-1970s. Hundreds of songs contributed by the team are still part of Malayalis' nostalgia. Apart from Vayalar, he has also given tunes to lyrics by other poets and songwriters like O. N. V. Kurup, P. Bhaskaran, and Sreekumaran Thampi.  Devarajan was at one point in time regarded as the doyen of film music in South India. He was much feared and respected by all musicians and singers of that period, for his sound knowledge of Classical music. It might be due to this dominance he had over others that he was widely known as arrogant. But he enjoyed a royal status till his death in the music circles.

Yesudas, P. Madhuri, P. Susheela, and P. Jayachandran sang most of his songs. He has sung with more than 130 singers. M. K. Arjunan, R. K. Shekhar, Johnson, Vidyasagar, Oussepachan, M. Jayachandran, Ilayaraja, A. R. Rahman and many others who later became famous as music directors worked as his assistants, conductors, and instrumentalists.

A complete work of Devarajan, Devageethikal, composed by himself, has released and the book is published by Authentic books. 

Devarajan died of a massive heart attack at his residence in Chennai on 15 March 2006. He was 78 at the time of his death, and was survived by his wife, two children - a daughter (elder) and a son (younger) - and some grandchildren. His body was taken airway to Thiruvananthapuram, and was cremated with state honors at Nehru Park in Paravur, his hometown.

Filmography
Malayalam
Omanakuttan (1964)
Bhoomidevi Pushpiniyayi (1974)
Ammini Ammavan(1976)
Vishnu Vijayam (1974)
Chattakari (1974)
Ponni (1976)
Shalini Ente Koottukari (1980)
Meen (1980)
Parankimala (1981)
Tamil
Kaaval Dheivam (1969)
Kasturi Thilakam (1970)
Annai Velankanni (1971)
Paruva Kaalam (1974)
Maram (1973)
Andharangam (1975)
Villiyanur Matha (1983)

Awards
Kerala State Film Awards:

 1969 – Best Music Director
 1970 – Best Music Director – Thriveni
 1972 – Best Music Director
 1985 – Best Music Director
 1991 – Best Background Music – Yamanam
 1999 – J. C. Daniel Award for Lifetime Achievement Award from the Government of Kerala

Kerala Film Critics Association Award
1977 - Kerala Film Critics Association Award for Best Music Director
1978 - Kerala Film Critics Association Award for Best Music Director
1979 - Kerala Film Critics Association Award for Best Music Director

Others
1980 - Kerala Sangeetha Nataka Akademi Fellowship

References

External links
Type a message
Hindu online, Soaring on the wings of poetry
Hindu online, Music from the heart
 Hindu online, Ode to a legend
Malayalam music orphaned – (Sunday Kaumudi)
R.I.P. G. Devarajan Master
Devarajan Master
 G Devarajan at MSI
 All Malayalam Movie Songs Composed by G Devarajan at MSI
 All Malayalam Non Movie Songs Composed by G Devarajan at MSI
 An interview with Devarajan Master

 https://www.thehindu.com/news/cities/kozhikode/remembering-a-master-composer/article6460893.ece

1927 births
2006 deaths
Indian atheists
Kerala State Film Award winners
Malayalam film score composers
Sree Narayana College, Kollam alumni
20th-century Indian composers
Artists from Kollam
Musicians from Kollam
Film musicians from Kerala
21st-century Indian composers
Indian male film score composers
20th-century Indian male singers
20th-century Indian singers
21st-century Indian male singers
21st-century Indian singers
Tamil film score composers
Male Carnatic singers
Carnatic singers
J. C. Daniel Award winners
Recipients of the Kerala Sangeetha Nataka Akademi Fellowship